Sensunapan River is a river in Sonsonate District, El Salvador.

References

Rivers of El Salvador